A population centre, in the context of a Canadian census, is a populated place, or a cluster of interrelated populated places, which meets the demographic characteristics of an urban area, having a population of at least 1,000 people and a population density of no fewer than 400 people per square km2.

The term was first introduced in the Canada 2011 Census; prior to that, Statistics Canada used the term urban area.

Statistics Canada listed 944 population centres in its 2011 census data; 513 of them, 54 per cent of all population centres in Canada, were located in Ontario or Quebec, the two most populous provinces.

History 
The term "population centre" was chosen in order to better reflect the fact that urban vs. rural is not a strict division, but rather a continuum within which several distinct settlement patterns, and several competing interpretations of the distinction, may exist. For example, a community may fit a strictly statistical definition of an urban area, but may not be commonly thought of as "urban" because it has a smaller population, or because it functions socially and economically as a suburb of another urban area rather than as a self-contained urban entity, or because it is geographically remote from other urban communities. Municipal boundaries are ignored in determining population centres and they are focused entirely on their geographic and built-up nature.

Accordingly, the new definition set out three distinct types of population centres: small (population 1,000 to 29,999), medium (population 30,000 to 99,999) and large (population 100,000 or greater). Despite the change in terminology, however, the demographic definition of a population centre remains unchanged from that of an urban area: a population of at least 1,000 people where the density is no fewer than 400 persons per square kilometre.

Characteristics 
A population centre does not necessarily correspond to the boundaries of a municipality or of a census division. For example, a less densely populated area within a city's municipal boundaries may not be included as part of its population centre, while areas outside the city limits that directly continue a city's urban core population may be included.

For example, the population centre of Toronto extends into neighbouring Peel Region, Halton Region, Durham Region and York Region, encompassing places such as Oakville, Mississauga, Brampton, Vaughan, Markham, Richmond Hill, Aurora, Newmarket, Pickering and Ajax. Despite this, numerous other communities which are considered part of the Greater Toronto Area for political purposes are not part of the population centre of Toronto; because more rural areas separate them geographically from the primary zone of urban settlement, communities such as Milton, Georgetown, Caledon, Bolton, Nobleton, Bradford and Stouffville instead form their own separate small or medium population centres, and even a portion of the city of Toronto itself, to the north and east of the Toronto Zoo in Scarborough, is excluded from the population centre as it is much less densely populated than the rest of the city.

However, the Statistics Canada definition of a population centre is that it does not cross the boundaries of a Census Metropolitan Area (CMA); even though the band of continuous urban development emanating outward from downtown Toronto along the shore of Lake Ontario extends even further into Hamilton and Oshawa, these two cities are both considered separate CMAs by Statistics Canada rather than being part of Toronto's, and accordingly each is also considered a distinct population centre.

Conversely, a single municipality may also contain more than one distinct population centre, if less densely populated or undeveloped regions separate more urbanized areas from one another. For example, Ottawa has seven distinct population centres (Ottawa-Gatineau, Constance Bay, Kanata, Richmond, Osgoode, Manotick and Metcalfe), the neighbouring city of Gatineau has a secondary population centre at Buckingham in addition to its primary urban core forming part of Ottawa-Gatineau, and Greater Sudbury has eight distinct population centres (Sudbury, Azilda, Capreol, Chelmsford, Coniston, Dowling, Lively and Valley East).

For actual "city limits" populations, see List of the largest municipalities in Canada by population, and for metropolitan area populations, see List of metropolitan areas in Canada.

Lists

By population rank

By province or territory 
List of population centres in Alberta
List of population centres in British Columbia
List of population centres in the Canadian Territories
List of population centres in Manitoba
List of population centres in New Brunswick
List of population centres in Newfoundland and Labrador
List of population centres in Nova Scotia
List of population centres in Ontario
List of population centres in Prince Edward Island
List of population centres in Quebec
List of population centres in Saskatchewan

See also 
List of the largest cities and towns in Canada by area
List of census metropolitan areas and agglomerations in Canada
Population of Canada by province and territory
List of largest Canadian cities by census
Population of Canada by year
List of cities in Canada
List of towns in Canada
Regional municipality

References 

Demographics of Canada
Canada
Population centres